The Office of the Attorney General of Myanmar (abbreviated OAG) serves as the Government of Myanmar's main legal advisory body. The Office is led by the Union Attorney General of Myanmar. The incumbent Attorney General is Dr Thida Oo, who was appointed on 2 February 2021 by Min Aung Hlaing. After the caretaker government was formed in 2021, the Union Attorney General's Office was reorganized into a ministry on 30 August 2021.

Sanctions 
On 31 January 2022, the U.S. Department of the Treasury added Attorney General, Dr Thida Oo, added to its Specially Designated Nationals (SDN) list. The UK and Canada joined the U.S in the sanctions against Oo, in a "coordinated action against Myanmar military regime, targeting individuals responsible for undermining democracy and rule of law".

See also
Attorney General of Myanmar
Cabinet of Myanmar
Ministry of Legal Affairs
Politics of Myanmar

References

External links
 Official website

Government ministries of Myanmar
Attorneys general of Burma
1948 establishments in Burma
Government agencies established in 1948
Specially Designated Nationals and Blocked Persons List
Entities related to Myanmar sanctions